Dendrophidion is a genus of New World colubrid snakes commonly referred to as forest racers.

Geographic range
Species in the genus Dendrophidion range from southeastern Mexico to Bolivia.

Species
The following 15 species are recognized as being valid.
Dendrophidion apharocybe Cadle, 2012
Dendrophidion atlantica Freire, Caramaschi & Gonçalves, 2010
Dendrophidion bivittatus (A.M.C. Duméril, Bibron & A.H.A. Duméril, 1854) – forest racer
Dendrophidion boshelli Dunn, 1944 – Boshell's forest racer
Dendrophidion brunneum (Günther, 1858) – Günther's forest racer
Dendrophidion clarkii Dunn, 1933
Dendrophidion crybelum Cadle, 2012
Dendrophidion dendrophis (Schlegel, 1837) – olive forest racer
Dendrophidion graciliverpa Cadle, 2012
Dendrophidion nuchale (W. Peters, 1863) – Peters' forest racer, pink-tailed forest racer
Dendrophidion paucicarinatum (Cope, 1894) – Cope's forest racer
Dendrophidion percarinatum (Cope, 1893) – South American forest racer
Dendrophidion prolixum Cadle, 2012
Dendrophidion rufiterminorum Cadle & Savage, 2012
Dendrophidion vinitor H.M. Smith, 1941 – barred forest racer

Nota bene: A binomial authority in parentheses indicates that the species was originally described in a genus other than Dendrophidion.

References

Further reading
Fitzinger L (1843). Systema Reptilium, Fasciculus Primus, Amblyglossae. Vienna: Braumüller & Seidel. 106 pp + indices. (Dendrophidion, new genus, p. 26). (in Latin).
Freiberg M (1982). Snakes of South America. Hong Kong: T.F.H. Publications. 189 pp. . (Genus Dendrophidion, p. 93).
Goin CJ, Goin OB, Zug GR (1978). Introduction to Herpetology, Third Edition. San Francisco: W.H. Freeman. xi + 378 pp. . (Genus Dendrophidion, p. 324).

External links

Colubrids
Snake genera
Taxa named by Leopold Fitzinger